The 2013–14 American Athletic Conference men's basketball season took place between November 2013 and concluded in March 2014. Practices began in October 2013, with conference play beginning in December, and the season ended with the 2014 American Athletic Conference men's basketball tournament. The season was the first since the split of the original Big East Conference into two separate leagues.

This was the first season that Houston, Memphis, SMU, Temple, and UCF participated in American Athletic competition. It was also the final season for Louisville and Rutgers in Big East/AAC competition, as these schools left for the Atlantic Coast Conference and Big Ten Conference respectively.

Preseason

Coaching changes
 Mike Rice was fired by Rutgers following a player abuse scandal.

Predicted American Athletic results
At American Athletic Conference media day on October 16, the conference released their predictions for standings and All-Conference teams.

first place votes

2013-14 Preseason All-American Athletic Teams

American Athletic Preseason Player of the Year: Russ Smith, Louisville
American Athletic Preseason Rookie of the Year: Keith Frazier, SMU

Preseason Watchlists

Rankings

Conference Schedules

Composite matrix
This table summarizes the head-to-head results between teams in conference play. (x) indicates games scheduled this season.

Cincinnati

|-
!colspan=9 style="background:#E00122; color:#000000;"| AAC Regular Season

|-
!colspan=9 style="background:#E00122; color:#000000;"| 2014 American Athletic Conference tournament

|-
!colspan=9 style="background:#E00122; color:#000000;"| NCAA tournament

Connecticut

|-
!colspan=12 style="background:#002868; color:white;"| Exhibition

|- 
!colspan=12 style="background:#002868; color:white;"| Regular season

|-
!colspan=12 style="background:#002868;"| AAC tournament

 
 
|-
!colspan=12 style="background:#002868;"| NCAA tournament

Houston

|-
!colspan=12 style="background:#CC0000; color:white;"| Exhibition

|-
!colspan=12 style="background:#CC0000; color:white;"| Non-conference regular season

|-
!colspan=12 style="background:#CC0000; color:white;"| American Athletic Conference regular season

|-
!colspan=12 style="background:#CC0000; color:white;"| American Athletic Conference tournament

Louisville
Louisville: 29 reg. season games, 3 postseason games vacated due to sanctions against the program.

|-
! colspan="12" style="background:#ad0000; color:#fff;"| Exhibition

|-
! colspan="12" style="background:#ad0000; color:#fff;"| Regular season

|-
! colspan="12" style="background:#ad0000; color:#fff;"| American Athletic Conference tournament

|-
! colspan="12" style="background:#ad0000; color:#fff;"| NCAA tournament

Memphis

|-
!colspan=9 style="background:#0C1C8C; color:#8E9295;"| Exhibition

|-
!colspan=9 style="background:#0C1C8C; color:#8E9295;"| Regular season

|-
!colspan=9 style="background:#0C1C8C; color:#8E9295;"| American Athletic Conference tournament

|-
!colspan=9 style="background:#0C1C8C; color:#8E9295;"| NCAA Tournament tournament

Rutgers

|-
!colspan=9 style="background:#CC0000; color:#000000;"| Exhibition

|-
!colspan=9 style="background:#CC0000; color:#000000;"| Regular season

|-
!colspan=9 style="background:#CC0000; color:#000000;"| American Athletic Conference tournament

SMU

|-
!colspan=9 style="background:#B10000; color:#032B66;"| Non-conference regular season

|-
!colspan=9 style="background:#B10000; color:#032B66;"| Conference regular season

|-
!colspan=9 style="background:#B10000; color:#032B66;"| American Athletic Conference tournament

|-
!colspan=9 style="background:#B10000; color:#032B66;"| NIT

South Florida

|-
!colspan=9 style="background:#006747; color:#CFC493;"| Exhibition

|-
!colspan=9 style="background:#006747; color:#CFC493;"| Regular season

|-
!colspan=9 style="background:#006747; color:#CFC493;"| American Athletic Conference tournament

|-

Temple

|-
!colspan=9 style="background:#9E1B34; color:#FFFFFF;"| Regular season

|-
!colspan=9 style="background:#9E1B34; color:#FFFFFF;"| American Athletic Conference tournament

UCF

|-
!colspan=9 style="background:#000000; color:#BC9B6A;"| Non-conference regular season

|-
!colspan=9 style="background:#000000; color:#BC9B6A;"| American Regular Season

|-
!colspan=9 style="background:#000000; color:#BC9B6A;"| American Athletic Conference tournament

Weekly honors
Throughout the conference regular season, the American Athletic names a player of the week and rookie of the week each Monday.

Postseason

  March 12–15, 2014 at the FedExForum in Memphis, Tennessee

NCAA tournament

National Invitation tournament

NBA draft
The following list includes all AAC players who were drafted in the 2014 NBA draft.

References

Notes